The green crombec (Sylvietta virens) is a species of African warbler, formerly placed in the family Sylviidae.
It is widespread across the African tropical rainforest.
Its natural habitats are subtropical or tropical moist lowland forests and subtropical or tropical moist shrubland.

References

green crombec
Birds of the African tropical rainforest
green crombec
Taxonomy articles created by Polbot